Mount Achernar is a peak forming the northeast end of the MacAlpine Hills, on the south side of Law Glacier. Named by the New Zealand Geological Survey Antarctic Expedition (NZGSAE) (1961–62) after the star Achernar used in fixing the survey baseline.

Mountains of the Ross Dependency
Shackleton Coast